The European Senior Badminton Championships is a tournament organized by the Badminton Europe (BE) since 1995 and is held once every two years to crown the best Veteran badminton players in Europe.

Championships

Medal count (1995 - 2014)

References

External links
 Badminton Europe: European Senior Championships-Individuals

Senior
Senior sports competitions
1995 establishments in Europe
Recurring sporting events established in 1995